Steven Coertse van Voorhees (1600 – 16 February 1684) was an early Dutch settler in America and the patriarch of the Voorhees family line and namesakes.

In 1664, he was a magistrate of what is now Flatlands and founder of the Dutch Reformed Church in present-day Flatlands, Brooklyn.

Biography

Early life 
Steven van Voorhees was born in 1600 in Hees, a village in Drenthe, The Netherlands. He was the son of Coert Albertse van Voorhees, of Hees, and the eldest of seven children. He married his first wife circa 1645.

New Netherland colony 
Van Voorhees left The Netherlands in April, 1660, along with his wife, Willempie Roelofse Suebering, and 8 of their 10 children.

Records indicate the family immigrated to the New Netherland settlement on either the ship "Borelekre" (translated, the "Spotted Cone," or the "Bonte Koe," which means the "Spotted Cow.") The two children, both daughters, who stayed behind would later come to America.

Some sources indicate that the name of his first wife is unknown. Others specify that her name was Aaltjen Wessels, who died around 1675.

Van Voorhees migrated to the Dutch colony of New Netherlands (present-day New York) in 1660, settling in Nieuw Amersfoort (present-day Flatlands), Long Island. He purchased a tract of land on 29 November 1660, from Cornelius Deriksen Hoogland for three thousand guilders. Of the nine morgen of corn land, seven morgen of salt meadow, seven morgen of woodland and ten morgen of plain land, the plot included a house and house plot, as well as brewery, which he operated.

In addition to being a farmer, Van Voorhees was a magistrate of the Flatlands in 1664. His name appears on a 1664 and a 1667 land patent. He founded the Dutch Reformed Church in Flatlands, and he and his second wife were members of the congregation.

Death 
His will is dated 25 August 1677, which has been called a "lengthy, odd document" in which he bequeaths his entire estate to his five surviving children. In 1683, he was manager of taxes in Flatlands.

Steven van Voorhees died 16 February 1684.

Name origin and variants
The name "Voorhees" is the anglicised form of "van voor Hees" which means from "before" or "in front of" Hees, a small village of about 9 houses and 50 inhabitants 1.25 miles (2 km) south of Ruinen.

Steven van Voorhees' paternal grandfather, Coert van voor Hees, resided near the front of the village of Hees.

Legacy
The van Voorhees have a family coat of arms, which was first published in America in 1880 by Elias W. van Voorhees.

Steven van Voorhees is considered the patriarch of a "pioneer family of Bergen County," and is considered the "founder," as well as the first American representative of the well-known Voorhees family line.

Among his namesakes is Voorhies Avenue in Brooklyn.

References

Sources

External links
 The Van Voorhees family tree

1600 births
1684 deaths
Dutch farmers
History of Brooklyn
People from De Wolden
Deacons
Dutch emigrants to New Netherland
Steven Van
People from Flatlands, Brooklyn